The Stranger Genius Awards, given by Seattle alternative weekly newspaper The Stranger, "bring attention to, and recognize the contributions of, … outstanding artists in Seattle." Winners are notified by receiving a chocolate cake bearing the message "You're a Friggin' Genius!"

Source for list: The Stranger Genius Awards: The Event, thestranger.com. Accessed online 2016-10-07. 2016 winners from "We Saw You Dancing, Drinking, Cheering, Crying, and Winning Thousands of Dollars at the Stranger Genius Awards", thestranger.com. Accessed online 2016-10-07.

Notes

External links
 

Arts-related lists
Culture of Seattle
Lists of award winners
Awards established in 2003
2003 establishments in Washington (state)